Christopher Warwick Godfrey Bassano (born 11 September 1975) is a South African-born cricketer and fly-fisher who lives in Tasmania. His father Brian was a South African sports journalist who wrote several books of cricket history.

As a resident of Tasmania, and yet a British national, Bassano qualified to play county cricket as an overseas player. On his County Championship debut in 2001 for Derbyshire he hit 186 not out and 106 against Gloucestershire. After finishing with a career-best average during the 2004 season, his form fell away in 2005 and he was released. He played a few Minor Counties matches for Cheshire in 2007.

Bassano lives in Tasmania, where he conducts fly fishing tours. He has represented Australia at fly fishing at Commonwealth and world championship level. He has also worked for Tasmania's Inland Fisheries Service on conservation and stocking programs. He designs and markets fishing flies.

References

External links
 
Chris Bassano at CricketArchive

1975 births
Living people
Cheshire cricketers
Cricketers from East London, Eastern Cape
Derbyshire cricketers
English cricketers
Tasmania cricketers
Fly fishing